The 1972 Marshall Thundering Herd football team was an American football team that represented Marshall University as an independent during the 1972 NCAA University Division football season. In its second season under head coach Jack Lengyel, the team compiled a 2–8 record and was outscored by a total of 254 to 93. The team played its home games at Fairfield Stadium in Huntington, West Virginia.

Schedule

References

Marshall
Marshall Thundering Herd football seasons
Marshall Thundering Herd football